Annihilator(s) may refer to:

Mathematics
 Annihilator (ring theory)
 Annihilator (linear algebra), the annihilator of a subset of a vector subspace
 Annihilator method, a type of differential operator, used in a particular method for solving differential equations
 Annihilator matrix, in regression analysis

Music
 Annihilator (band), a Canadian heavy metal band
 Annihilator (album), a 2010 album by the aforementioned band

Other media
 Annihilator (Justice League), an automaton in the fictional series Justice League Unlimited
 Annihilators (Marvel Comics), a team of superheroes
 Annihilator, a 2015 science fiction comic by Grant Morrison and Frazer Irving
 Annihilator (film), a 1986 television film starring Mark Lindsay Chapman
 The Annihilators (film), a 1985 action film by Charles E. Sellier Jr.
 The Annihilators (novel), a 1983 novel by Donald Hamilton

See also
 Annihilation (disambiguation)